The Wherry Lines are railway branch lines in the East of England, linking  to  and . There are 14 stations including the three termini. They form part of Network Rail Strategic Route 7, SRS 07.11 and are classified as a rural line.

The lines pass through the Broads of Norfolk and Suffolk. The name is taken from the Norfolk wherries, which played an important role in the transport of goods and people around the Broads before road and rail transport became widespread.

Passenger services on the Wherry Lines are currently operated by Abellio Greater Anglia.

History
The route was opened from Norwich to Great Yarmouth by the Norwich and Yarmouth Railway in 1844, running via . The line from Reedham to Lowestoft was added in 1847 by Samuel Morton Peto as part of the Norfolk Railway. Finally, the northern route from Norwich to Great Yarmouth via  was added in 1883 by the Great Eastern Railway, opening from Breydon Junction to Acle on 12 March, and through to Brundall on 1 June.

Community rail
In 2007 the services operating on the line were designated as community rail services as part of the Community Rail Development Strategy aiming to increase patronage and income, improve cost control and develop a greater sense of community involvement.

Infrastructure

The line from Norwich to Lowestoft is double-track throughout, but the two Great Yarmouth branches that diverge from  via Acle and from Reedham via  are single-track, although the branch via Acle was formerly double-track throughout.

The Wherry Lines are not electrified, hence services are formed by Bi-mode multiple units.

Of the 14 stations, two are request stops. At most of the stations on the Wherry Lines, service frequencies are increased during the summer months.

The signalling system was modernised in 2018–19. The line between Reedham and Great Yarmouth was closed from 20 October 2018 when it opened again in April 2019. Network Rail a bus replacement service was available during the works In January 2019, it was reported that the project was overrunning and that the line between Reedham and Great Yarmouth would not reopen in April 2019 as scheduled. No firm date was initially given as to when the line would reopen. The Great Yarmouth-Reedham line reopened on 24 February 2020.

Rolling stock
Passenger services are operated by Abellio Greater Anglia, typically using Class 755 trains. In 2015 the train operator introduced DRS Class 37 locomotive-hauled services due to a shortage of rolling stock as the route is not electrified. These ceased following the introduction of the 755s in 2019.

On Mondays to Saturdays, one service in each direction between Norwich and Lowestoft is served by East Midlands Railway Class 158 Express Sprinter units, operated by Greater Anglia. The service runs in the early morning on both journeys.

Nearly all services on the line run to and from Norwich. Some summer Saturday services were extended to and from London Liverpool Street via Norwich which ran to and from Great Yarmouth. These services were formed of British Rail Class 90 electric locomotives with Mark 3 Coaching Stock, which were hauled from Norwich by a British Rail Class 47 diesel locomotive. The services have now ceased favouring connections with existing local services, due to the complexity of the coupling and uncoupling and other issues which led to poor reliability of the mainline operation.

References

External links
The Wherry Lines
YARMOUTH AND NORWICH RAILWAY – Parliamentary debate – 1842 Hansard
A Map with the locations of the stations

Rail transport in Norfolk
Rail transport in Suffolk
Community railway lines in England
Railway lines in the East of England
Standard gauge railways in England